Tilden is an unincorporated community in Middle Township, Hendricks County, Indiana.

History
A post office was established at Tilden in 1880, and remained in operation until it was discontinued in 1913. The community was named for politician Samuel J. Tilden.

Geography

References

Unincorporated communities in Hendricks County, Indiana
Unincorporated communities in Indiana
Indianapolis metropolitan area